Material is a 2012 South African film, directed by Craig Freimond and written by Craig Freimond, Ronnie Apteker, Robbie Thorpe, Rosalind Butler and Riaad Moosa. After playing at Film Africa 2012, it has been shown at numerous film festivals around the world (London, International Film Festival of India, Busan) and gained a reputation as one of the best original South African films and a significant leap forward for the country's film industry. Its portrayal of the lives of Muslims in South Africa was seen as an honest attempt to tackle some of the social issues facing the country's multiracial society.

Plot
Set in the Muslim Indian enclave of Fordsburg, Johannesburg. Material revolves around the tempestuous relationship between Cassim Kaif and his aging father whose one dream is for his son to take over the family's fabric shop, which is struggling to stay afloat. However, Cassim wants to be a stand-up comedian, a notion that his traditionalist father strongly disapproves of. When Cassim lands a gig at a local bar, he has to find a way of keeping it a secret from his family. The film's portrayal of the clash between youth, tradition and religion, alternates between family drama and snippets from the world of stand-up comedy.

Cast
 Riaad Moosa as Cassim Kaif
 Vincent Ebrahim as Ebrahim Kaif
 Joey Yusuf Rasdien as Yusuf
 Denise Newman as Fatima Kaif
 Krijay Govender as Dadi Kaif
 Zakeeya Patel as Aisha Kaif
 Carishma Basday as Zulfa Ahmed
 Royston Stoffels as Rafiq Kaif
 Quanita Adams as Shareen
 Afzal Khan as Faheem
 Mel Miller as Merv
 Nik Rabinowitz as Dave Gold

Awards
7th South African Film and Television Awards (2013) - Best Director of a Feature Film (Craig Freimond), Best Actor in a Feature Film (Riaad Moosa), Best Supporting Actor in a Feature Film (Vincent Ebrahim), Best Feature Film, Best Sound Designer of a Feature Film

Sequel

It was titled New Material, alongside arrivals Riaad Moosa, Vincent Ebrahim, Denise Newman and Joey Yusuf Rasdien. It will be released on 1 October 2021.

References

External links 
 

2012 films
English-language South African films
2010s English-language films